Notre-Dame-de-la-Compassion may refer to:

Churches:

Schools:
 Etablissement Notre-Dame-de-la-Compassion